A tankard is a form of drinkware.

Tankard or The Tankard may also refer to:

 Tankard (surname), including a list of people with the surname
 Tankard (band), a German thrash metal band
The Tankard (album), a 1995 album by the band
Ontario Tankard, Ontario men's provincial curling championship

See also